St George-in-the-East is an Anglican Church dedicated to Saint George; located on Cannon Street Road, between The Highway and Cable Street, in the East End of London. Behind the church lies St George's Gardens, the original graveyard.

Community work
In May 2015, the church entered into a partnership with the Centre for Theology and Community (CTC), an ecumenical charity which is based in its East Crypt. Anglican clergy working for CTC now serve the parish, and the second floor is the home to the Community of St George, a group of lay Christians who assist in the worship and mission of the church.

History
The church is one of six Hawksmoor churches in London, England. It was built from 1714 to 1729, with funding from the 1711 Act of Parliament. Its name has been used for two forms of parish (areas of land) surrounding, one ecclesiastical which remains and one a Civil counterpart, a third tier of local government. The latter assisted public facilities in the late 19th century but ceded its dwindling purposes to the Metropolitan Borough of Stepney so was abolished in 1927. The church was designated a Grade I listed building in 1950.

In 1836, the parish of St George in the East was constituted as a Poor Law parish under the Poor Law Amendment Act 1834.

In the 1850s, Archibald Campbell Tait, then Bishop of London, appointed a Low Church lecturer, which was contrary to the High Church attitude of the rector and curate. As a protest, there were catcalls and horn blowing, and some male members of the congregation went into the church smoking their pipes, keeping their hats on, and leading barking dogs. Refuse was thrown onto the altar. The church was closed for a while in 1859, and the rector, owing to his poor health, was persuaded by the author Tom Hughes to hand over his duties to a locum.

The church was hit by a bomb during the Second World War Blitz on London's docklands in May 1941. The original interior was destroyed by the fire, but the walls and distinctive "pepper-pot" towers stayed up.  In 1964 a modern church interior was constructed inside the existing walls, and a new flat built under each corner tower.

Ian Nairn wrote of it in his 1966 guide to London: “A ruin among ruins, in the lost part of Stepney [after the Blitz, and before being blitzed by the Borough Council?]  ... The old life has gone ... the new has not yet come ...  It makes no difference to Hawksmoor’s bizarre poetry.  This is probably the hardest building to describe in London ...  This is a stage somewhere beyond fantasy ... it is the more-than-real world of the drug addict’s dream.”

Popular culture
It appeared in the 1980 film The Long Good Friday starring Bob Hoskins. It also appeared in S02E01 of Killing Eve.

Gallery

See also

 List of churches and cathedrals of London
 Stepney Historical Trust
 All Saints' Church, Pontefract - a church ruined in the English Civil War with a modern church constructed within

References

External links

 Parish website
 The Centre for Theology and Community
 Parish history website
EoLFHS Parishes: St George in the East
 East and West London by the Rev. Harry Jones. Published by Smith, Elder & Co., 1875
 Outline map of parishes of Stepney in 1903 (area 27)
 St. George's-in-the-East From "The Copartnership Herald", Vol. II, no. 24 (February 1933)

Churches completed in 1729
Church of England church buildings in the London Borough of Tower Hamlets
18th-century Church of England church buildings
Parks and open spaces in the London Borough of Tower Hamlets
Nicholas Hawksmoor buildings
English Baroque church buildings
Grade I listed churches in London
Grade I listed buildings in the London Borough of Tower Hamlets
George in the East
Georgian architecture in London
Diocese of London
1729 establishments in England
Shadwell